Vasa is an unincorporated community in Vasa Township, Goodhue County, Minnesota, United States.

Vasa is nine miles east of Cannon Falls and 12 miles west-southwest of Red Wing at the junction of State Highway 19 (MN 19) and County 7 Boulevard. It is within ZIP code 55089, based in Welch.

The entire community is listed on the National Register of Historic Places as the Vasa Historic District. It was established in 1853 by Swedish immigrant farmers. While its population declined significantly in the twentieth century, it is well-preserved, and its National Register nomination described it as "the most intact... of the original Swedish colonies in Minnesota". The Old Vasa Swedish Lutheran Church, which was built in 1861, is now a museum of local Swedish history.

References

Unincorporated communities in Minnesota
Unincorporated communities in Goodhue County, Minnesota
National Register of Historic Places in Goodhue County, Minnesota
Historic districts on the National Register of Historic Places in Minnesota